Nach Dem Goldrausch is the second album by German indie rock band Fotos, first released in March 2008 on Virgin Germany.

Track listing

"Nach Dem Goldrausch" ("After the Goldrush") – 3:49
"Serenaden" ("Serenades") – 3:00
"Ein Versprechen" ("A Promise") – 3:46
"Ich Häng An Dir Und Du Hängst An Mir" ("I Follow You and You Follow Me") – 2:58
"Explodieren" ("Explode") – 4:27
"Ein Freak Und Ein Spinner" ("A Freak and a Nutcase")  – 4:11
"Das Ist Nicht Was Ich Will" ("That Is Not What I Want") – 3:13
"Fotos" ("Photos") – 3:53
"Essen, Schlafen, Warten Und Spielen"("Eat, Sleep, Wait and Play")  – 2:40
"Kalifornien" ("California") – 4:58

Some 2008 editions of this album also include the bonus track "Don't Stop 'Til You Get Enough", while a 2009 edition includes the bonus track "Du Fehlst Mir".

External links
Official website
Fotos at Last.fm

2008 albums
Virgin Records albums